This list of longest films is composed of films with a running time of 300 minutes (5 hours) or more.

Cinematic films
Note: Some releases are extended cuts or director's cuts, and are ranked according to the longest verified running time.

Experimental films

While most cinematic films have a broad theatrical release in multiple locations through normal distribution channels, some of the longest films are experimental in nature or created for art gallery installations, having never been simultaneously released to multiple screens or intended for mainstream audiences. They may have been shown in venues where audiences were only expected to view a portion of the film during its screening.

Films released in separate parts
This section lists films conceived as an artistic unity and produced simultaneously, or consecutively with no significant interruption or change of production team, even though they were released with separate premières.

See also
National Film Registry
Slow cinema
Marathon
Back-to-back film production
List of films with longest production time
List of longest films in India

References

Longest
Longest
Longest films
F